The men's tournament of rugby sevens at the 2013 Summer Universiade was held from July 14 to 17 in Kazan, Russia.

Preliminary round

Group A

Group B

Group C

Group D

Elimination round
The elimination round will be split into three tiers: in descending order, the medal, plate, and bowl tiers. The top two finishers of each group in the preliminary round will move on to the medal tier for a chance to compete for medals, while the rest of the teams will be relegated to the bowl section of the elimination round. The losers of the medal tier quarterfinals will play in the plate tier, and the losers of the bowl tier quarterfinals will play classification games.

Bowl tier

Quarterfinals

Classification

Semifinals

Final

Plate tier

Semifinals

Final

Medal tier

Quarterfinals

Semifinals

Bronze-medal match

Gold-medal match

Final standings

References

Men